Ancient Dreams is the third album of Swedish doom metal band Candlemass, released in 1988 and reissued in 2001 by Powerline Records with a bonus CD. The cover art of the album is a painting made by Thomas Cole, second in his series, "The Voyage of Life", entitled "Youth". Ancient Dreams was the first Candlemass album to chart in the US, debuting at No. 174 on the Billboard 200 album chart.

"Epistle 81" (Märk hur vår skugga), was written by Swedish poet/musician Carl Michael Bellman (1740 – 1795). "Incarnation of Evil" is actually a reworked version of the old Nemesis track "Black Messiah."

The band were not happy with the album's sound mix for which they blamed their then record label. The band felt that the album production had been rushed in order to have the LP released in time for their US tour.

Track listing

The track "Black Sabbath Medley" is a CD bonus track and is composed of parts of songs from Black Sabbath, namely: "Symptom of the Universe", "Sweet Leaf", "Sabbath Bloody Sabbath", "Into the Void", "Electric Funeral", "Supernaut", "Black Sabbath".

Personnel
Candlemass
 Messiah Marcolin – vocals
 Lars Johansson – lead guitar
 Mats Björkman – rhythm guitar
 Leif Edling – bass
 Jan Lindh – drums

Production
 Rex Gisslén – mixing at Montezuma Studios, Stockholm
 Peter Dahl – mastering at Polar Studios, Stockholm
 Wendy Kramer – artwork, graphics
 Micke Lind – remastering
 Micke Mårtensson – artwork, layout
 Ulf Magnusson – photography

Charts

References

Candlemass (band) albums
1988 albums
Active Records albums
Enigma Records albums
Metal Blade Records albums